Oronogo is a city in Jasper County, Missouri, United States. The population was 2,558 at the 2020 census. It is part of the Joplin, Missouri Metropolitan Statistical Area.

History
Oronogo was platted in 1856.

The name, according to local tradition, came about when it was found that the previous name, "Minersville" was already taken. At a public meeting to change the name, after considering many possibilities, a man in the back blurted out "its Ore or no go", referring to the mining operations. Elaborating on that, Colonel J. M. Young, suggested substituting the Spanish word "Oro" for ore, and the dropping the "or" to make the word euphonious. He pronounced it "Oronogo" and the audience accepted the name.

Geography
Oronogo is located at  (37.190202, -94.467289).

Demographics

2010 census
As of the census of 2010, there were 2,381 people, 772 households, and 646 families living in the city. The racial makeup of the city was 91.9% White, 0.3% African American, 2.0% Native American, 0.6% Asian, 1.4% from other races, and 3.8% from two or more races. Hispanic or Latino of any race were 4.0% of the population.

There were 772 households, of which 53.9% had children under the age of 18 living with them, 68.5% were married couples living together, 10.6% had a female householder with no husband present, 4.5% had a male householder with no wife present, and 16.3% were non-families. 12.4% of all households were made up of individuals, and 3.5% had someone living alone who was 65 years of age or older. The average household size was 3.08 and the average family size was 3.33.

The median age in the city was 29 years. 35.5% of residents were under the age of 18; 7.4% were between the ages of 18 and 24; 34.4% were from 25 to 44; 17% were from 45 to 64; and 5.7% were 65 years of age or older. The gender makeup of the city was 49.6% male and 50.4% female.

2000 census
As of the census of 2000, there were 976 people, 350 households, and 263 families living in the city. The population density was 484.1 people per square mile (186.6/km). There were 403 housing units at an average density of 199.9 per square mile (77.0/km). The racial makeup of the city was 93.65% White, 2.05% Native American, 0.10% Asian, 0.92% from other races, and 3.28% from two or more races. Hispanic or Latino of any race were 1.74% of the population.

There were 350 households, out of which 40.9% had children under the age of 18 living with them, 63.4% were married couples living together, 9.1% had a female householder with no husband present, and 24.6% were non-families. 22.3% of all households were made up of individuals, and 7.1% had someone living alone who was 65 years of age or older. The average household size was 2.79 and the average family size was 3.25.

In the city the population was spread out, with 32.0% under the age of 18, 8.0% from 18 to 24, 30.7% from 25 to 44, 20.5% from 45 to 64, and 8.8% who were 65 years of age or older. The median age was 31 years. For every 100 females, there were 89.9 males. For every 100 females age 18 and over, there were 90.3 males.

The median income for a household in the city was $33,839, and the median income for a family was $36,339. Males had a median income of $27,250 versus $19,000 for females. The per capita income for the city was $11,626. About 15.5% of families and 19.4% of the population were below the poverty line, including 27.6% of those under age 18 and 24.4% of those age 65 or over.

References

Cities in Jasper County, Missouri
Joplin, Missouri, metropolitan area
Cities in Missouri